Orinoma is a genus of butterflies of the family Nymphalidae found in Asia.

Species

Listed alphabetically:
 Orinoma alba Chou & Li, 1994
 Orinoma damaris  Gray, 1846 - tigerbrown

References

External links
Images representing Orinoma at Consortium for the Barcode of Life

Satyrini
Butterflies of Indochina
Taxa named by George Robert Gray
Butterfly genera